Mary H. Goode is an American Democratic politician from Roxbury, Massachusetts, she was the second black female legislator in the state. She represented the 10th Suffolk district in the Massachusetts House of Representatives from 1975 to 1978.

Early life 
Goode was born in 1927 in Zebulon, Georgia and her family moved to Boston, Massachusetts just before she started high school.

Personal life 
Goode was a mother of three and attended Tufts University in her 40s and graduated in 1974.

Goode's son, Raymond, drowned at the age of 21 while trying to swim across Houghton's Pond.

Career 
Goode defeated Emanuel Eaves by 19 votes and Leon Rock by 43 votes in the 1974 election.

See also
 1975-1976 Massachusetts legislature
 1977-1978 Massachusetts legislature

References

Year of birth missing
Year of death missing
Members of the Massachusetts House of Representatives
Women state legislators in Massachusetts
20th-century American women politicians
20th-century American politicians
People from Roxbury, Boston
African-American state legislators in Massachusetts
African-American women in politics
People from Zebulon, Georgia
Tufts University alumni